= Firebrook, Lexington =

Neighborhood in Lexington, Kentucky

Coordinates: 37.991°N 84.597°W

Firebrook is a neighborhood in southwestern Lexington, Kentucky, United States. Its boundaries are Harrodsburg Road to the east, Military Pike to the north, Keene Road to the west, and the Jessamine County line to the south.

Neighborhood statistics

- Population in 2000: 1,581
- Land Area: 0.492 square miles (1.27 km^{2})
- Population density: 3,217
- Median household income: $105,827
